Edición extra is a 1949 Argentine film directed by Luis Moglia Barth and starring Jorge Salcedo and Silvana Roth.

Cast
Jorge Salcedo as Alberto Giménez
Silvana Roth as Irene Garmendia
Alita Román as Lucila Torres
Eduardo Cuitiño as Carlos Linares
Domingo Sapelli as Diputado Méndez
Federico Mansilla as Senador Medina
Elisardo Santalla as Eusebio Pedroso
José de Angelis as Dr. Gigena
Carlos Fioriti as Chávez
Ricardo Trigo as Pedro

References

External links
 

1949 films
1940s Spanish-language films
Argentine black-and-white films
Films directed by Luis Moglia Barth
1940s Argentine films